Michael Richard Bell is a Canadian former diplomat. He was appointed Ambassador Extraordinary and Plenipotentiary to Peru, then to Bolivia and then to Mongolia. Bell was later appointed to Mongolia and to the Union of Soviet Socialist Republics. He was then concurrently appointed to the Netherlands, Tajikistan, Georgia, Kyrgyzstan, Azerbaijan and Belarus.

External links 
 Foreign Affairs and International Trade Canada Complete List of Posts

Notes 

Year of birth missing (living people)
Living people
Ambassadors of Canada to Peru
Ambassadors of Canada to Bolivia
Ambassadors of Canada to Mongolia
Ambassadors of Canada to the Soviet Union
Ambassadors of Canada to the Netherlands
Ambassadors of Canada to Tajikistan
Ambassadors of Canada to Georgia (country)
Ambassadors of Canada to Kyrgyzstan
Ambassadors of Canada to Azerbaijan
Ambassadors of Canada to Belarus